Guarea pyriformis is a species of plant in the family Meliaceae. It is endemic to Costa Rica.

References

pyriformis
Endemic flora of Costa Rica
Vulnerable plants
Taxonomy articles created by Polbot